Anand Sivakumaran is a writer, director based in India. He began his life as a chemical engineer from IIT Bombay, before a drastic career change. After dabbling with advertising, journalism and event management, he ended up working in Mumbai's television and film industry as a writer and director.

Career

Anand Sivakumaran is the founder of the creative collective – CrocTales. The company creates and works as Showrunner on web series and also does scripts for film and television. They have written shows for Alt, Applause and are creating shows for platforms like Jio, Arre, Hungama etc.

Anand's debut novel Natasha Mehra Must Die is out in bookstores now. Someone is killing every girl and woman by the name of Natasha Mehra and unless the titular collegian heroine can figure who or what, she'll be next.

Anand has directed films like - Money Devo Bhava, an edgy, youth movie about greed and consumerism and how it drives college kids to amoral activities and  Detour, a wicked little thriller about lust, lies and cups of tea. He has written feature films Nazar, Kalyug  and Buddha Mar Gaya

Anand has written, directed and created a variety of shows for Indian Television encompassing the genres of sitcoms, thrillers, kids shows, drama, telefilms and game shows - The Buddy Project, Sadda Haq, Kabhi Haan, Kabhi Naa, Miley Jab Hum Tum, Jassi Jaisi Koi Nahin, Jabb Love Hua, Guns and Roses, Izzat Ka Falooda (Won the ITA award for best mini Series), Lucky, Antariksh, Suvreen Guggal Topper of the Year, and many more.

Anand has a storytelling podcast ‘The Croc’s Tales’ which is available on Apple Podcasts, Saavn, Tune-in and other platforms.

Anand does live, interactive storytelling at venues like Hive, Social, Lil Flea etc.

Anand wrote and directed the short film Hello Goodbye. which was acquired by Friday Moviez and has since been viewed by over 5 million netizens. He has recently also written and directed the short film Square One which is being entered into festivals now. His film (Dreamers a 32 min short film on which he was the Screenwriter) won accolades at festivals abroad.

Anand has conducted courses on TV and Film Production for mass media students at MET, Bandra and KC College, Dept. of Mass Media.. He's also conducting screenwriting and filmmaking workshops at several colleges, schools and for working adults as well.

Anand has also conducted the coaching modules, ‘Leveraging Storytelling in Business’ for Price Waterhouse Coopers and ‘Storytelling for Impact’ and ‘Imbibing Storytelling’ for Deloitte.

Anand can be reached @Anandloki on Twitter 
@anandSivakumaran_storyteller on Instagram

Credits 

 Bekaboo (Web Series) (2019) (Screenplay, Dialogues)
 Hello Mini Season 1,2,3 (Web Series) (2019-2021) (Screenplay, Dialogues)
 Natasha Mehra Must Die (Book) (2018) [Author]
 Adhafull (TV series) (2017) [Writer]
 Sadda Haq (TV series) (2013-2016) [Conceptualized]
 The Buddy Project (2012-2014) [Conceptualized, Screenplay Dialogues]
 Money Devo Bhava (2012) [Writer, Director]
 Buddha Mar Gaya (2007) [Screenplay, Dialogues]
 Detour (not released) [Writer, Director]
 Kalyug (2005)[Screenplay]
 Nazar (2005)[Screenplay]

Sources 

https://www.imdb.com/title/tt0456558/combined
https://www.imdb.com/title/tt0499041/combined
https://web.archive.org/web/20070504123043/http://mammovies.com/blog.html%3Cbr />
https://web.archive.org/web/20071011081645/http://mammovies.com/Template%20Files/FILMMAKERS-A/anand%20sivakumaran%20profile/ANANDS.html

References

Film directors from Mumbai
Indian male screenwriters
Living people
Year of birth missing (living people)